Jaekel is a surname. Notable people with the surname include:

 Goya Jaekel (born 1974), German footballer
 Otto Jaekel (1863–1929), German paleontologist and geologist
 Thomas Jaekel (born 1959), German rower